St Devereux railway station was a station in Kilpeck, Herefordshire, England. The station was opened in 1854 and closed in 1958.

References

Further reading

Disused railway stations in Herefordshire
Railway stations in Great Britain opened in 1854
Railway stations in Great Britain closed in 1958
Former Great Western Railway stations